An election to Preseli Pembrokeshire District Council was held in May 1991. The Independent councilors retained the vast majority of seats. It was preceded by the 1987 election and followed, after local government re-organization, by the 1995 Pembrokeshire County Council election. On the same day there were elections to the other local authorities and community councils in Wales.

Boundary Changes
There were no boundary changes at this election.

Ward Results

Brawdy (one seat)

Burton (one seat)
No election was held as the sitting member, Jack Lewis, was unopposed; however he died before polling day.

Camrose (one seat)

Castle (one seat)

Cilgerran (one seat)

Clydau (one seat)

Crymych (one seat)

Dinas Cross (one seat)

Fishguard (two seats)

Garth (three seats)

Goodwick(one seat)

Hakin (three seats)

Haverfordwest Prendergast (one seat)

Haverfordwest Priory (one seat)

Johnston (one seat)

Letterston (one seat)

Llangwm (one seat)

Maenclochog (one seat)

Merlin's Bridge (one seat)
Affie Webb lost his seat after the drawing of lots.

Milford Haven, Central and East (three seats)

Milford Haven, North and West (two seats)
An Independent had gained a seat from the Liberal Democrats at a by-election.

Newport (one seat)

Neyland East (one seat)

Neyland West (one seat)

Rudbaxton(one seat)

St David's (one seat)

St Dogmaels (one seat)
No election was held as no nominations were submitted.

St Ishmaels (one seat)

Scleddau (one seat)

Solva (one seat)

The Havens(one seat)

Wiston (one seat)

By-Elections 1991-1995

Burton by-election 1991
A by-election was held in the Burton ward  following the death of the sitting member shortly before the 1991 election.

St Dogmaels by-election 1991
A by-election was held in the St Dogmaels ward after no nominations were received for the regular election.

References

1991
1991 Welsh local elections